Jonathan Martín Carabias (born 6 March 1981 in Salamanca, Region of León) is a Spanish footballer who plays for CD Guijuelo as a defender.

Career statistics

Club

References

External links

1981 births
Living people
Sportspeople from Salamanca
Spanish footballers
Footballers from Castile and León
Association football defenders
La Liga players
Segunda División players
Segunda División B players
Tercera División players
Real Valladolid Promesas players
Real Valladolid players
Cultural Leonesa footballers
Racing de Ferrol footballers
CD Guijuelo footballers